Lantechildis (or Lenteildis) was a Frankish noblewoman, the daughter of the Frankish king Childeric I (d. 481) and the Thuringian noblewoman Basina (d. 477). She was a sister of Clovis I. She is mentioned in Gregory of Tours and the Liber historiae Francorum.

Lantechildis converted to Arianism and received Arian baptism. She may have been influenced to convert after her sister Audofleda converted at her marriage to the Ostrogothic king Theoderic the Great. Later she converted again and received a Catholic baptism like her brother and sister, Albofledis. Clovis' baptism took place between 496/498 and 508/509. Her conversion from heresy was the subject of a sermon by Bishop Avitus of Vienne entitled in Latin Homilia de conversione Lenteildis Chlodovaei sororis, "Homily on the conversion of Clovis' sister Lenteildis". Avitus preached the sermon at her baptism.

Notes

Sources

5th-century Frankish women
Merovingian dynasty
5th-century Arian Christians
Converts to Roman Catholicism